Love and Light is the second album from UK rock group Proud Mary. The album reached #172 in the UK album charts.

Track listing 
"Love to Love You"
"Hats Off!"
"Love and Light"
"Mexico"
"Rain on Me"
"Blues"
"Lady of the Country"
"Mundane Morning"
"She Don't Know"
"Never Good Night"
"Into Your Arms"
"The End"

References

External links 
Official website

2004 albums
Proud Mary (band) albums